Esther Erlich (born 1955) is a Melbourne-based Australian artist who has been exhibiting since 1985. She won the 1998 Doug Moran National Portrait Prize with her painting, "Gaunt and Glorious" a portrait of Steve Moneghetti. In 2000 Esther won the Archibald People's Choice Award with her painting of Bill Leak.

Her works can be found in the collections of the National Library of Australia, the National Portrait Gallery, ALP Building Canberra, Council for Adult Education Victoria, Royal Overseas League Australian Collection, Performing Arts Museum Victoria.

References

Let's Face It - The History of the Archibald Prize by Peter Ross
AGNSW Gallery (Dec 2000 - Jan 2001 edition), National Gallery of Victoria publication
The National Library of Australia's 38th Annual Report 1997-1998
Who's Who of Australian Visual Artists by D.W. Thorpe (Nov 1995)
Australian Artist (Dec 1991)
Portraits of Australia 1990 Doug Moran National Portrait Prize Collection

External links
 

Australian women painters
Living people
21st-century Australian women artists
21st-century Australian artists
Artists from Melbourne
Doug Moran National Portrait Prize winners
Archibald Prize People's Choice Award winners
1955 births
People educated at Mac.Robertson Girls' High School